Mitchell Adam Lucker (October 20, 1984 – November 1, 2012) was an American vocalist best known as the lead singer for the deathcore band Suicide Silence.

Career 
Mitch Lucker first started performing music in the year 2000 with the band Breakaway, which would later become the Corona local metalcore band Dying Dreams. Dying Dreams featured Lucker on vocals and his brother Cliff on guitar, along with later Suicide Silence bandmates Josh Tufano on second guitar and Mike Olheiser on bass. Around a year before Dying Dreams broke up, Mitch Lucker was inducted into Suicide Silence when the band was still deemed a side-project.

Suicide Silence's debut album, The Cleansing, sold 7,250 copies in the first week. Their second album No Time to Bleed was released in June 2009. The band's last album to feature Lucker, The Black Crown was released in July 2011. When asked by Kerrang!, Lucker explained, "I'm not trying to put people's beliefs down – it's about me and my life. This is my head cracked open and poured on the paper! I still have the same beliefs and same views, but I'm more open to everything. At this point in my life, I don't see the good in making people hate you for something you say. This record is for everybody."

Influences 
In an interview with The AU Interview, he said the bands that influenced him into starting a band were "Korn, Deftones, Slayer, Slipknot, Sepultura, Pantera, Black Sabbath, Dio, Nirvana, Van Halen, Cannibal Corpse, Death... everything that my dad would buy and bring home to me and my brother saying 'Hey, listen to this."

Tattoos 

Lucker was casually known for his extensive and large collection of tattoos on his body covering his arms, torso, neck/throat, hands, fingers and even his face. The only place he refused to ever get tattooed was on his back. He explained this by stating "I like seeing the artwork because it is artwork! [Having my back tattooed would] be like owning an expensive painting that you can never see. Like, 'Oh, I have this beautiful, expensive painting, but you can't see it because it's at my uncle's house."

Lucker's signature black bars that he had on each of his fingers were cover-ups. The original tattoos he had displayed across his fingers was "FORXEVER", a common word used within the straight edge community. Lucker had these tattoos covered with the black bars after he renounced his straight-edge lifestyle in 2007.

Death 
Mitch Lucker died on November 1, 2012, following severe injuries incurred from a motorcycle accident in Huntington Beach, California. He was pronounced dead by the Orange County Coroner's Office at 6:17 a.m. that morning. One report stated that Lucker had crashed his motorcycle shortly after 9 p.m. on October 31 and was pronounced dead on November 1, 2012.

His Suicide Silence bandmates held a memorial show, "Ending Is the Beginning", on December 21, 2012, which took place at the Fox Theater in Pomona, California. It served to benefit his daughter's education costs. The band has also started the Kenadee Lucker Education Fund and continues to promote donations to her.

Discography 

With Suicide Silence
 Suicide Silence (2005)
 The Cleansing (2007)
 No Time to Bleed (2009)
 The Black Crown (2011)
 You Can't Stop Me (2014) (writing credits on two tracks)

With Dying Dreams
 Demo (2003)

With Commissioner
 What Is? (2011)

Collaborations

References

External links

1984 births
2012 deaths
21st-century American singers
American heavy metal singers
American male singer-songwriters
Burials in California
Motorcycle road incident deaths
Musicians from Riverside, California
Road incident deaths in California
Singer-songwriters from California
21st-century American male singers